The Binningup Desalination Plant is a desalination plant near Binningup, Western Australia, about  south of Perth. It supplies water to the state capital Perth, as well as the nearby regional city of Bunbury and is known as the Southern Seawater Desalination Project  It was designed to initially deliver 50 gigalitres of potable water per year but was expanded to deliver 100 gigalitres of potable water per year, or 33% of Perth's requirements. The plant was officially opened in September 2011 at reduced output, and was completed and operating at full capacity in January 2013.

The site is in Taranto Road, Binningup, about 1,200 metres from the coast with most of the plant situated in a now disused limestone quarry. The Harvey facility has one 32 megalitre storage tank operational with another one under construction. There is allowance at the site for four 32 megalitre storage tanks.

See also
List of desalination plants in Australia
Reverse osmosis plant

References

External links

Science and technology in Western Australia
Desalination plants in Australia
Water supply and sanitation in Western Australia
Shire of Harvey